Gölgede Aynı (Same in the Shadow) is the second album released in 1996 of the Turkish pop singer Mustafa Sandal. This album is considered to be his most commercially successful album.

Track listing

Original version

Credits
 Music direction, arrangements: Mustafa Sandal
 Mixing: Marti Jane Robertson
 Publisher: Şahin Özer
 Photography: Sevil Sert

Music videos
 "Araba"
 "Jest Oldu"
 "Bir Anda (Remix)"

Notes

Mustafa Sandal albums
1996 albums